Newland is a surname.  Notable people with the name include:

 Abraham Newland (1730-1807), English banker
 Courttia Newland (born 1973), English novelist
 Dan Newland (born 1949), American journalist, translator, blogger, and writer
 Henry Garrett Newland (1805–1860), English cleric and author
 Henry Simpson Newland (1873-1969), Australian surgeon
 James Newland (1881-1949), Australian WWI Victoria Cross recipient
 James E. Newland (1830-1907), American politician
 John Newland (1917-2000), US director and actor
 John Newlands (Australian politician) (1864–1932), was known as John Newland until May 1926
 Martin Newland (born 1961), British journalist
 Marv Newland, North American animation filmmaker
 Richard Newland (cricketer) (1713-1778), English cricketer
 Richard Francis Newland ( –1873), banker, politician and public servant in South Australia
 Ridgway William Newland (1788–1864), Congregationalist minister in South Australia, head of large family
 Simpson Newland (1853-1925), Australian pastoralist, author and politician
 Victor Marra Newland (1876-1953), Australian army officer and politician
 William C. Newland (1860-1938), American lawyer and politician